The Amarillo Challengers were a soccer club based in Amarillo, Texas that competed in the SISL and USISL.

Year-by-year

Sports in Amarillo, Texas
Defunct soccer clubs in Texas
USISL teams
1986 establishments in Texas
1992 disestablishments in Texas
Association football clubs established in 1986
Association football clubs disestablished in 1992
Defunct indoor soccer clubs in the United States